The siege of Tudela was the main action of the French military campaign in Spain in 1087 in conjunction with Kings Alfonso VI of León and Castile and Sancho V of Navarre and Aragon. The arrival of a French army under Odo I, Duke of Burgundy, and William, Viscount of Melun, early in the spring of 1087 was a response to Alfonso's plea for military aid, which was generated by the offensive of the Almoravids on Iberia. After defeating Alfonso at the Battle of Sagrajas on 23 October 1086, the Almoravids retreated before the French could arrive. Alfonso then convinced his allies to direct their energies at Tudela, the northernmost fortress of the taifa of Zaragoza. The siege was a complete failure militarily, but several important negotiations took place there among the besieging parties.

References

1087 in Europe
11th century in Al-Andalus
Tudela
11th century in the Kingdom of León
Tudela
Tudela
Taifa of Zaragoza